Terence or Terrance Mitchell can refer to:
Terence Mitchell (1929–2019), museum curator at the British Museum
Terence Frederick Mitchell (1919–2007), British linguist
Terrance Mitchell (born 1992), American football player

See also
Terry Mitchell
Terry Riley, born Terrence Mitchell Riley